In mathematics, the linear span (also called the linear hull or just span) of a set  of vectors (from a vector space), denoted , is defined as the set of all linear combinations of the vectors in . 
For example, two linearly independent vectors span a plane.
It can be characterized either as the intersection of all linear subspaces that contain , or as the smallest subspace containing . The linear span of a set of vectors is therefore a vector space itself. Spans can be generalized to matroids and modules.

Definition

In the case of infinite , infinite linear combinations (i.e. where a combination may involve an infinite sum, assuming that such sums are defined somehow as in, say, a Banach space) are excluded by the definition; a generalization that allows these is not equivalent.

Examples
The real vector space  has {(−1, 0, 0), (0, 1, 0), (0, 0, 1)} as a spanning set. This particular spanning set is also a basis.

Another spanning set for the same space is given by {(1, 2, 3), (0, 1, 2), (−1, 3), (1, 1, 1)}, but this set is not a basis, because it is linearly dependent.

That space is also spanned by the set {(1, 0, 0), (0, 1, 0)}, as (1, 1, 0) is a linear combination of (1, 0, 0) and (0, 1, 0).

The set of monomials , where  is a non-negative integer, spans the space of polynomials.

Theorems

Equivalence of definitions

Proof.

Suppose that  is a linear subspace of  containing .

Size of spanning set is at least size of linearly independent set

Proof. We want to show that .

Thus  is linearly dependent, and we can remove one vector from  that is a linear combination of the other elements.

To verify this, we assume by way of contradiction that . Then, at the th step, we have the set  and we can adjoin another vector . This is a contradiction, since  is linearly independent.

Spanning set can be reduced to a basis
Let  be a finite-dimensional vector space. If the axiom of choice holds, this is true without the assumption that  has finite dimension. This also indicates that a basis is a minimal spanning set when  is finite-dimensional.

Generalizations
Generalizing the definition of the span of points in space, a subset  of the ground set of a matroid is called a spanning set if the rank of  equals the rank of the entire ground set.

The vector space definition can also be generalized to modules.

consisting of all R-linear combinations of the elements . As with the case of vector spaces, the submodule of A spanned by any subset of A is the intersection of all submodules containing that subset.

Closed linear span (functional analysis)
In functional analysis, a closed linear span of a set of vectors is the minimal closed set which contains the linear span of that set.

One mathematical formulation of this is

The closed linear span of the set of functions xn on the interval [0, 1], where n is a non-negative integer, depends on the norm used. If the L2 norm is used, then the closed linear span is the Hilbert space of square-integrable functions on the interval. But if the maximum norm is used, the closed linear span will be the space of continuous functions on the interval. In either case, the closed linear span contains functions that are not polynomials, and so are not in the linear span itself. However, the cardinality of the set of functions in the closed linear span is the cardinality of the continuum, which is the same cardinality as for the set of polynomials.

Notes
The linear span of a set is dense in the closed linear span. Moreover, as stated in the lemma below, the closed linear span is indeed the closure of the linear span.

Closed linear spans are important when dealing with closed linear subspaces (which are themselves highly important, see Riesz's lemma).

A useful lemma
Then

(So the usual way to find the closed linear span is to find the linear span first, and then the closure of that linear span.)

See also
Affine hull
Conical combination
Convex hull

Citations

Sources

Textbooks
 
 
 
 
 
 Lay, David C. (2021) Linear Algebra and Its Applications (6th Edition). Pearson.

Web

External links 
 Linear Combinations and Span: Understanding linear combinations and spans of vectors, khanacademy.org.
 

Abstract algebra
Linear algebra